Mer hahn en neue Oberkeet (We have a new governor), 212, is a secular cantata by Johann Sebastian Bach. It was entitled the "Cantate burlesque" (burlesque cantata) by Bach himself, but is now popularly known as the Peasant Cantata. It is the last definitely dated Bach cantata.

History and text 
This cantata's libretto was written by Christian Friedrich Henrici, known as Picander, and was written for performance on 30 August 1742. On that day the Erbherr, Lehnherr and Gerichtsherr Carl Heinrich von Dieskau, Saxon-Crown-Princely Kammerherr to the Rittergut Kleinzschocher near Leipzig, celebrated his thirty-sixth birthday with a huge fireworks display and, as was customary, took homage from the peasants on the same occasion. It is thought that Picander asked Bach to set his poetry to music.

The text describes how an unnamed farmer laughs with the farmer's wife Mieke about the tax collector's machinations while praising the economy of Dieskau's wife, ending by especially cheering on Dieskau. In places it uses the dialect of Upper Saxony ("Guschel" for mouth, "Dahlen" for love-games, "Ranzen" for belly and "Neu-Schock" for a 60 Groschen piece).

Scoring and structure 
The cantata is scored for two voices: the farmer (bass) and Mieke (soprano). The instrumentation includes a string trio of violin, viola and basso continuo, accompanied by a flute, horn and second violin respectively.

The piece has 24 movements, more than any other Bach cantata:
Overture (A major- A minor- A major)
Duet aria:  (A major)
Duet recitative:  (A major)
Aria (soprano):  (A major)
Recitative (bass):  (D major)
Aria (bass):  (D major)
Recitative (soprano):  (B minor)
Aria (soprano):  (B minor)
Duet recitative:  
Aria (soprano):  (G major)
Recitative (bass):  
Aria (bass):  (B-flat major)
Recitative (soprano): 
Aria (soprano):  (A major)
Recitative (bass):  
Aria (bass):  (G major)
Recitative (soprano):  
Aria (soprano):  (D major)
Recitative (bass): 
Aria (bass):  (A major)
Duet recitative: 
Aria (soprano):  (B minor)
Duet recitative:  
Chorus:  (F major)

Music 
In accordance with the nature of the text, Bach created a relatively simple composition held with short sentences and usually simple accompaniment.  He repeatedly drew on popular dance forms, folk and popular melodies (such as La Folia and the folk song "Mit dir und mir ins Federbett, mit dir und mir aufs Stroh", whose title translates as "With you and me into the feather bed, with you and me onto the straw") and excerpts from his own pieces (BWV Anh. 11 and BWV 201 / 7).

Recordings 
 Rudolf Ewerhart, Württemberg Chamber Orchestra. Bach Cantatas. Vox 1965
 Nikolaus Harnoncourt, Concentus Musicus Wien. J. S. Bach: Cantatas BWV 211 & BWV 212. Telefunken 1967
 Peter Schreier, Kammerorchester Berlin. Bach made in Germany Vol. VII – Secular Cantatas VII, Eterna 1975
 Rosmarie Hofmann, Gregory Reinhadt, Linde-Consort, Hans-Martin Linde. J. S. Bach: Bauern-Kantate; Kaffee-Kantate. EMI Reflexe 1984
 Emma Kirkby, David Thomas, Academy of Ancient Music, Christopher Hogwood. J. S. Bach: Coffee Cantata / Peasant Cantata. L'Oiseau-Lyre 1987
 Helmuth Rilling, Bach-Collegium Stuttgart. Edition Bachakademie Vol. 67 – Secular Cantatas. Hänssler 1996
 Ton Koopman, Amsterdam Baroque Orchestra. J. S. Bach: Complete Cantatas Vol. 5. Antoine Marchand 1996
 Masaaki Suzuki, Bach Collegium Japan. J. S. Bach: BWV 203, 209, 212. BIS 2016
Bach: Kantaten No. 32, Orchester der J. S. Bach-Stiftung, Rudolf Lutz, J. S. Bach-Stiftung, 2020

References

Bibliography 
 Alfred Dürr: Johann Sebastian Bach: Die Kantaten. Kassel: Bärenreiter, 1999. 
 Werner Neumann: Handbuch der Kantaten J.S.Bachs. 1947, 5. Auf. 1984. 
 Hans-Joachim Schulze: Die Bach-Kantaten: Einführungen zu sämtlichen Kantaten Johann Sebastian Bachs. Leipzig: Evangelische Verlags-Anstalt; Stuttgart: Carus-Verlag 2006. (Edition Bach-Archiv Leipzig)  (Evang. Verl.-Anst.),  (Carus-Verl.)
 Christoph Wolff, Ton Koopman: Die Welt der Bach-Kantaten. Stuttgart; Weimar: Verlag J. B. Metzler, 2006.

External links 
 
 Cantata BWV 212 Mer hahn en neue Oberkeet on bach-cantatas
 Mer hahn en neue Oberkeet on the Bach website (in German)
 Entries for BWV 212 on WorldCat

Secular cantatas by Johann Sebastian Bach
1742 compositions